Christian praise and worship may refer to:

Christian worship, a summary of worship practices within Christianity
Contemporary worship, a form of Christian worship 
Contemporary worship music, a subgenre of contemporary Christian music

See also
 Contemporary Christian worship (disambiguation)
 Praise and worship (disambiguation)